Notre Dame Academy is a Catholic, all-girls, college-preparatory high school within the Diocese of Covington, sponsored by the Sisters of Notre Dame of Covington, Kentucky. Notre Dame Academy is the only all-girls single-gender high school for girls in Northern Kentucky. Notre Dame Academy is located in Park Hills, Kentucky, United States.

History 
Notre Dame Academy was first established in 1874 as a Catholic grade school with an initial class of seven students. The school offered kindergarten through eighth grade plus a two-year commercial school. A school building on Fifth Street was dedicated on July 26, 1876. The school expanded to include a high school program in 1906. In 1937, the elementary school program was discontinued due to growing enrollment in the high school.

By the 1950s, the school had outgrown its downtown Covington location and Notre Dame Academy moved to nearby Park Hills. The new campus, on the grounds of the Sisters of Notre Dame provincial house, cost nearly $ to build (equivalent to $ in ). It opened in October 1963.

In 1996, Notre Dame Academy completed a $ project (equivalent to $) to renovate and expand the school building, adding a gymnasium. The school began another renovation and expansion project in 2007, which added athletic fields and a theater.

In 2019, Notre Dame Academy completed a $ capital campaign to renovate its 20th century building.

Academics 
The U.S. Department of Education recognized Notre Dame Academy as a National Blue Ribbon School of Excellence in 1996, 2012 and 2019.

Athletics 
Notre Dame is a member of the Kentucky High School Athletic Association (KHSAA) and has won 29 state championships and has 32 state runner-up titles. The majority of the school's students participate in one or more of 14 sports: archery, basketball, bass fishing, bowling, cheer, cross-country, golf, lacrosse (club), soccer, softball, swimming, tennis, track, and volleyball.

Notable people

Notable alumnae 
 Laura Cottingham art critic, curator, and visual artist
 Morgan Hentz Professional volleyball player and member of the U.S. national team
 Amy McGrath former fighter pilot, 2018 U.S. congressional candidate, and 2020 U.S. Senate candidate
 Roxanne Qualls mayor of Cincinnati

Notable faculty

References

External links
 

Roman Catholic Diocese of Covington
Educational institutions established in 1874
Catholic secondary schools in Kentucky
Girls' schools in Kentucky
Schools in Kenton County, Kentucky
1874 establishments in Kentucky